Scandinavian Kitchen is a Scandinavian delicatessen and grocery store in 61 Great Titchfield Street, London. Its menu is based on the smörgåsbord and the Danish smørrebrød (open sandwich) and draws on the Scandinavian tradition of uncomplicated food served on rye bread. The Kitchen's grocery section stocks over 600 food products from all over Scandinavia including a large selection of pickled herring, specialty cheeses and crisp bread as well as chocolate and the northern European speciality, salty liquorice. Opened in 2007, it was the first Scandinavian delicatessen to open in London.

See also
 List of delicatessens
 List of restaurants in London

References

External links
Official Website

European restaurants in London
Delicatessens in the United Kingdom
Scandinavian restaurants
2007 establishments in the United Kingdom